Charles Leonard Aidman (January 21, 1925 – November 7, 1993) was an American actor of stage, film, and television.

Early life
Aidman was born in Frankfort, Indiana, the son of George E. and Etta (Kwitny) Aidman.  Aidman graduated from Frankfort High School and attended DePauw University prior to serving in the United States Navy during World War II. After the war he returned to his home state and graduated from Indiana University.

Career
Aidman guest-starred on NBC's The Virginian in the episode "The Devil's Children" and twice on the NBC western series The Californians. He also appeared twice on Richard Diamond, Private Detective. He portrayed a bounty hunter on the ABC's western series Black Saddle. He was cast in CBS's fantasy drama, Twilight Zone, in the  episodes "And When the Sky Was Opened" and "Little Girl Lost." He also guest-starred on five other western series: the ABC/Warner Brothers series Colt .45; ABC's The Rebel, NBC's Riverboat, as Frank Paxton in the episode "The Fight at New Canal"; The Americans, CBS's Trackdown, as Len Starbuck in "The Samaritan"; and CBS's Johnny Ringo, as Jeffrey Blake in "The Stranger".

Aidman guest-starred on the NBC children's western Fury in episodes of the ABC/WB crime drama Bourbon Street Beat, and in the syndicated aviation adventure series Whirlybirds. He appeared from 1959 to 1960 in different roles in three episodes of the syndicated crime drama U.S. Marshal. Aidman made a guest appearance on the CBS courtroom drama Perry Mason in 1960 as murderer Arthur Siddons in "The Case of the Gallant Grafter." Aidman also guest starred in a 1961 episode of the western TV series Bonanza ("The Rival") as Jim Applegate.

In 1961, in a Peter Gunn episode entitled "Witness in the Window", Aidman hires Peter Gunn to investigate a woman blackmailing him over alleged sexual improprieties he denies.

In "Shadow of the Past" (October 7, 1961) of the NBC western series The Tall Man, Aidman is cast as Ben Wiley, the father of Sue Wiley, the latest girlfriend of Billy the Kid.

Aidman was cast as George Ellsworth, an official with the United States Embassy in Warsaw, Poland, in the three-part 1963 episode "Security Risk" of the CBS anthology series GE True. He also played a sex education teacher in an episode of Slattery's People, "Do The Ignorant Sleep in Pure White Sheets"?

In 1963, Aidman adapted Spoon River Anthology by poet Edgar Lee Masters into a theater production that is still performed.

He appeared on another NBC western series, The Road West, in its 1966 episode "The Lean Years."  That same year Aidman played a scientist who turned into a werewolf in an episode of Voyage to the Bottom of the Sea.  He then guest-starred on CBS's The Wild Wild West in a recurring role for several episodes during the series' fourth season as Jeremy Pike, one of Jim West's substitute sidekicks. In 1968 he appeared in ABC's The Invaders as research scientist Julian Reed in the episode "The Pit".

In 1970, Aidman appeared in Hawaii Five O as Dr. Royce, and in 1974, he introduced the character Louis Willis (later known as Tom Willis), father-in-law-to-be of Lionel Jefferson, on the February 1974 episode of CBS's All In The Family, "Lionel's Engagement". He also played a teacher in an episode in the sixth season of The Andy Griffith Show and made two guest appearances on The Dick Van Dyke Show.

Aidman played the father of Elmer Dobkins in an episode of Little House on the Prairie and appeared in an episode of the 1974 police drama Nakia.  Three years later, he portrayed a memorable character in an episode of M*A*S*H, "The Grim Reaper," playing Colonel Bloodworth, a callous, sadistic commander who takes pleasure in predicting casualties and reducing his troops to statistics.  Later, from 1985 to 1987, Aidman was the original narrator for the revival of The Twilight Zone series until he was replaced by Robin Ward.

His film roles were in Pork Chop Hill (1959), War Hunt (1962), Hour of the Gun (1967), Countdown (1968), Angel, Angel, Down We Go (1969), Tell Them Willie Boy Is Here (1969), Adam at 6 A.M. (1970), Kotch (1971), Dirty Little Billy (1972), Deliver Us from Evil (1973), Twilight's Last Gleaming (1977), Zoot Suit (1981), Uncommon Valor (1983), and Innerspace (1987), the latter being one of his final acting appearances.

Personal life and death
Aidman was married to model Frances Garman. He died of cancer in Beverly Hills, California. He is interred in the Room of Prayer at Westwood Village Memorial Park Cemetery in Los Angeles.

Filmography

References

External links
 
 
 
 
 

1925 births
1993 deaths
People from Frankfort, Indiana
Military personnel from Indiana
Indiana University Bloomington alumni
Male actors from Indiana
American male stage actors
American male film actors
American male television actors
20th-century American male actors
Male actors from Los Angeles
Deaths from cancer in California
Burials at Westwood Village Memorial Park Cemetery
United States Navy personnel of World War II
United States Navy sailors